Carlo Cristofori (5 January 1813 – 30 January 1891) was an Italian Cardinal of the Roman Catholic Church who was Cardinal-Deacon of Santi Vito, Modesto e Crescenzio from 1885 to 1891.

References

External links
Catholic Hierarchy 

19th-century Italian cardinals
1813 births
1891 deaths
Cardinals created by Pope Leo XIII